The 31st Edition Vuelta a España (Tour of Spain), a long-distance bicycle stage race and one of the three grand tours, was held from 27 April to 16 May 1976. Andres Oliva won the mountains classification while Dietrich Thurau won the points classification.

Teams and riders

Route

Doping cases
When Belgian cyclist Eric Jacques finished in second place in the eighth stage, he became the new leader. Later, it became known that he tested positive for doping after that stage, and he received a penalty of ten minutes.
Previously, Günter Haritz had been penalized for the same offence, and had left the race.

Results

Final General Classification

References

 
1976 in road cycling
1976
1976 in Spanish sport
April 1976 sports events in Europe
May 1976 sports events in Europe
1976 Super Prestige Pernod